The Tobacco Bowl (or Tobacco Festival Bowl) was a college football bowl game that was held in Richmond, Virginia from 1949 to 1982. It was not a postseason bowl game, and it typically featured regional teams from Virginia, North Carolina and South Carolina. The Tobacco Bowl was always played in Richmond City Stadium and was, on occasion, the host of the annual Virginia–Virginia Tech rivalry game. The game was part of the National Tobacco Festival, which was held in Richmond every fall from 1948 until 1984. The football game eventually became just the University of Richmond Spiders against a visiting team from elsewhere in the southeast.

Game results
Note: Results are difficult to find; the following results have been compiled from various sources.

References

Recurring sporting events established in 1949
Recurring events disestablished in 1982
Defunct college football bowls
Sports in Richmond, Virginia